The 18th season of the television series Arthur aired from September 29, 2014 to September 10, 2015 on PBS and comprised 10 episodes. William Healy replaces Drew Adkins as Arthur, Andrew Dayton replaces Jake Beale as D.W., and Max Friedman Cole replaces Siam Yu as Brain for part of the season continuing permanently for the next season.

Episodes

References

2014 American television seasons
2015 American television seasons
Arthur (TV series) seasons
2014 Canadian television seasons
2015 Canadian television seasons